Temnostoma fumosum is a species of syrphid fly in the family Syrphidae.

Distribution
Japan.

References

Eristalinae
Insects described in 1944
Diptera of Asia
Taxa named by Frank Montgomery Hull